Juan Daniel García Treviño (born 2000) is a Mexican singer, actor and dancer who was born in Nuevo León. He is most well known for playing the main role in the 2019 movie I'm No Longer Here by Fernando Frías. When he was cast for the role, he was 16 years old and working in welding and construction, with no previous acting experience. García's father was a drug dealer and he dropped out of school in fifth grade. Garcia won an Ariel Award, Mexico's top film prize, for Breakthrough Performance. Since the movie, he has also worked as a model for Elle and GQ in Mexico.

He has also acted in the feature films La Civil and Wetiko. He has further played a small role in an episode of the series Narcos: México.

References

Mexican male film actors
2000 births
Living people
21st-century Mexican male actors
People from Nuevo León
Male actors from Nuevo León
Singers from Nuevo León

Ariel Award winners